Berlin Dialogue for Orchestra is a live album by American jazz composer/arranger Oliver Nelson featuring performances by a big band recorded at the Berliner Jazztage in 1971 and first released on the Flying Dutchman label.

Reception

The AllMusic review by Scott Yanow stated: "None of the individual pieces caught on but taken as a whole, this out-of-print LP should please big-band collectors and serves as a good example of Oliver Nelson's writing style".

Track listing
All compositions by Oliver Nelson.
 "Berlin Dialogue for Orchestra" - 18:25
 "Confrontation"
 "Check point Charlie"
 "Relative Calm"
 "Over the Wall"
 "Impressions of Berlin: Ku-Damm" - 6:02
 "Impressions of Berlin: Wannsee" - 5:21
 "Impressions of Berlin: Heidi" - 6:07 
 "Impressions of Berlin: Berlin bei Nacht" - 5:14

Personnel
Oliver Nelson - alto saxophone, arranger, conductor
Milo Pavlovic, Ronny Simmonds, Carmell Jones, Harry Stamp, Manfred Stoppachier - trumpet
Slide Hampton, Barry Ross, Åke Persson, Charles Orieux, Kurt Masnick - trombone
Leo Wright, Klaus Marmulla - alto saxophone
Adi Feuerstien, Rolf Romer - tenor saxophone
Jan Konopasek - baritone saxophone
Freddy L'Host - clarinet
Kai Rautenberg - piano
Hajo Lange - bass
Dai Bowen, Heinz Niemeyer - percussion

References

1971 live albums
Albums arranged by Oliver Nelson
Albums conducted by Oliver Nelson
Albums produced by Bob Thiele
Flying Dutchman Records live albums
Oliver Nelson live albums